Ugrenović is a Serbian and Croatian surname. It may refer to:

Aleksandar Ugrenović, Yugoslav forestry professor
Dragan Ugrenović, footballer
Đorđe Ugrenović, a victim in the Goraždevac murders

See also
Ugrinović
Dragomir Ugren

Croatian surnames
Serbian surnames